1010 Mass is a high-rise building in Washington, D.C. The building rises 15 floors and  in height. The building was designed by architectural firm Esocoff & Associates and was completed in 2007, making it one of the most recently constructed high-rises in the city. As of July 2008, the structure stands as the 24th-tallest building in the city, tied in rank with 1620 L Street, 1333 H Street, 1000 Connecticut Avenue, the Republic Building, 1111 19th Street, the Army and Navy Club Building and the Watergate Hotel and Office Building. 1010 Mass is an example of postmodern architecture, with a facade composed of brick and cast stone. The structure is composed almost entirely of residential units, with a total of 163 condominiums; the lowest floor is used for retail. The entire structure also rises above a 169-unit underground parking garage.

See also
List of tallest buildings in Washington, D.C.

References

Residential buildings completed in 2007
Residential condominiums in Washington, D.C.
Residential skyscrapers in Washington, D.C.
2007 establishments in Washington, D.C.